Nadezhda "Nadia" van Dyne (née Pym) is a fictional superhero appearing in American comic books published by Marvel Comics. Created by Mark Waid and Alan Davis, the character first appeared in Free Comic Book Day 2016 Civil War II (July 2016).

The daughter of Hank and Maria Pym, Nadia was raised as an assassin of the Red Room before escaping with the use of her father's Pym Particles and becoming the Unstoppable Wasp. Like her predecessor and surrogate parent Janet van Dyne, Nadia is depicted as having the ability to shrink to a height of several centimeters, fly by means of insectoid wings, and fire bioelectric energy blasts, while like her biological father she has bipolar disorder. She is a founding member of G.I.R.L. as well as a longtime leader of the organization.

Nadia has been described as one of Marvel's most notable and powerful female heroes, being labelled as an asexual character with bipolar disorder.

Publication history

Nadia van Dyne is loosely based on the character of Hope Pym seen in the MC2 universe. The name "Nadia" is of Slavic origin and translates to "Hope", thus making the connection more prevalent. She briefly had her own comic, The Unstoppable Wasp, but it was cancelled after eight issues for low sales. A second series with the same title debuted in October 2018. This second series was, in turn, cancelled after ten issues. She also starred in Ant-Man and the Wasp, a five-issue limited series with Scott Lang / Ant-Man, in 2018.

In May 2020, Disney Books published a young adult novel written by Sam Maggs titled The Unstoppable Wasp: Built On Hope.

Fictional character biography
Nadia is the child of Hank Pym and his first wife, Maria Trovaya, who was abducted and supposedly killed by foreign agents. Nadia was raised in the Red Room until she obtained a Pym Particle sample and escaped. Initially intending to meet her father, Nadia learns that he is more or less dead, and instead uses parts of his costume and other materials to create a Wasp suit, hoping to obtain the admiration of her father's allies. She later meets Janet van Dyne, and they get along quite well, with Janet feeling that she has the potential to become a true hero.

Nadia soon joins the Avengers and gains U.S. citizenship. Upon realizing that S.H.I.E.L.D.'s index of the world's most intelligent people doesn't list any women above 27th place, she starts the program G.I.R.L. (Genius In action Research Labs) to look for women with genius intellects. When choosing a legal name, Nadia takes the surname 'van Dyne', as she does not know much about her birth parents and Janet has believed in and supported her.

At one point she aids Scott Lang — who is in outer space at that time — in an attempt to return to Earth, which results in a sequence of bizarre adventures in the microverse. However, in the process, the two of them became quantum-entangled with each other.

In issue 4 of the second series, it's revealed that Nadia has bipolar disorder, just like her father, eventually learning he is still alive and merged with Ultron.

Powers and abilities
Nadia can use the Pym Particles in her bloodstream to alter her size at will. She has the ability to shrink down to subatomic size. She uses wasp like wings to fly at a tiny size. She also possess Pym Particles in her gauntlets that allow her to change the size of people and objects. Nadia is also able to grow in size much like her father and adoptive mother, although it is not yet known what the limit of this ability is yet. She can generate strong bio-electric blasts from her hands.

Additionally, Nadia is a skilled martial artist as a result of her Red Room training, particularly in Krav Maga. She is an expert gymnast and acrobat. Nadia also  has a gifted intellect.

Reception

Accolades 

 In 2020, CBR.com ranked Nadia van Dyne 6th in their "10 Most Powerful Members Of The Pym Family" list and 9th in their "10 Most Powerful Teen Heroes In Marvel Comics" list.
 In 2021, Screen Rant included Nadia van Dyne in their "10 Most Powerful Members Of The Champions" list and in their "Red Room's Most Powerful Members" list.
 In 2021, CBR.com ranked Unstoppable Wasp 5th in their "Marvel: 10 Smartest Female Characters" list.
 In 2022, Screen Rant included Nadia van Dyne in their"10 Asexual Icons In Comic Books" list.

In other media

Video games 

 The Nadia van Dyne / Wasp iteration of the character is a playable character in Marvel: Future Fight.

Collected editions

References

External links
 Nadia van Dyne on the Marvel Wiki

Avengers (comics) characters
Characters created by Mark Waid
Characters created by Alan Davis
Comics about women
Comics characters introduced in 2016
Fictional asexuals
Fictional assassins in comics
Fictional characters who can change size
Fictional characters with bipolar disorder
Fictional female assassins
Fictional female martial artists
Fictional Krav Maga practitioners
Fictional immigrants to the United States
Fictional people with acquired American citizenship
Russian superheroes
Fictional female scientists
Marvel Comics mutates
Marvel Comics female superheroes
Marvel Comics LGBT superheroes
Marvel Comics martial artists
Marvel Comics telepaths
Superheroes who are adopted